Marta Domínguez Fernández (born 2 August 2001 in Vigo) is a Spanish professional squash player. As of August 2021, she was ranked number 78 in the world.

References

2001 births
Living people
Spanish female squash players
21st-century Spanish women